Hartford Public Schools (HPS) is a school district serving the city of Hartford, Connecticut. Hartford Public Schools is the largest public school district in Connecticut, serving 46 magnet and non-magnet schools in the district. The graduation rate for Hartford public schools in 2016–2017 was 68.8%, lower than the state average of 87.9%.

History 

Hartford Public High School, the second oldest public high school in the United States, was founded by Rev. Thomas Hooker in the 17th century as a school that would prepare men for Puritan ministry. Hartford Public High School was funded in large part by the will of Governor Edward Hopkins in 1657. Hartford Public High School, as it is known now, was officially opened in 1847. Bulkeley High, Capital Prep, and Weaver High School were a few of the many high schools that were opened in Hartford in the early 20th century. Due to the advent of war during the early 20th century, Hartford's population boomed which led to the opening of many public high schools during the mid-century.

The Sheff v. O'Neill Connecticut Supreme Court decision in 1996 concluded that school districting based on town boundary lines was unconstitutional and led to a large disparity in racial and ethnic minorities in Hartford Public High Schools. In 1997, state legislature passed An Act Enhancing Educational Choices and Opportunities, which created inter-district magnet schools to preserve equal educational opportunity with racial and ethnic balance in Hartford. The magnet school program in Hartford has grown to include 20 magnet schools in the county, which can be attended by students across the state of Connecticut.

Leadership

List of past superintendents 

 Dr. Leslie Torres-Rodriguez (2017–Current)
 Beth Schiavino-Narvaez (2014–2016)
 Christina Kishimoto (2011–2014)
 Dr. Steven J. Adamowski (2006–2011)
 Robert Henry (2002–2006)
 Anthony S. Amato (1999–2002)

Schools

Demographics 
Over 20,000 students attend Hartford public schools. 76% of students are Hartford residents, while 24% are residents from 78 other Connecticut towns. In the 2018–2019 school year, non-magnet Hartford public school students were 30% African-American, 64% Hispanic, 3% White, 2% Asian, and 1% other populations. Magnet Hartford public schools were 31% African-American, 38% Hispanic, 20% White, 7% Asian, and 4% other populations.

In 2018–2019, 97 languages were spoken by Hartford public school students. Out of the 97 languages, 58% spoke English, 33% spoke Spanish, 1% spoke Serbo-Croatian, 1% spoke Karen, 1% spoke Portuguese, and 6% of students spoke 92 other languages.

Out of the 2018–2019 student population, 18% of students were special education students. 66% of special education students were male while 34% were female. 72% of specially educated students were enrolled in non-magnet schools, 7% were in magnet schools, 9% were in 19 in-district programs, and 12% were in 61 outplacement programs.

See also

List of the oldest public high schools in the United States

References

External links
 Hartford Public Schools

School districts in Connecticut
Public Schools